Hello, 'Frisco is a 1924 American silent short comedy film directed by Slim Summerville and starring Summerville, Bobby Dunn, and a host of famous film actors of the era. It was produced and distributed by Universal Pictures.

Cast

See also
A Trip to Paramountown (1922)
Hollywood (1923)
Souls for Sale (1923)
Mary of the Movies (1924)
Fascinating Youth (1926)
Show People (1928)
 Hoot Gibson filmography

External links

1924 films
American silent short films
Universal Pictures short films
American black-and-white films
Silent American comedy films
1924 comedy films
Rin Tin Tin
1920s American films
1920s English-language films